Dudley County is one of the 141 Cadastral divisions of New South Wales. Part of the southern border near the coast is the Apsley River.

Dudley County was named in honour of Dudley Ryder, Second Earl of Harrowby (1798-1882).

Parishes within this county
A list of parishes found within this county; their LGA and mapping coordinates to the approximate centre of each location is as follows:

References

Counties of New South Wales